Keith Dudgeon may refer to:

 Keith Dudgeon (Australian cricketer) (born 1946), Australian cricketer
 Keith Dudgeon (South African cricketer) (born 1995), South African cricketer